The discography of American country artist Jeanne Pruett consists of six studio albums, one live album, three compilation albums and 37 singles. While working for a publishing company, she signed a recording contract with RCA Records in 1963. She released several singles that did not become successful. In 1969, she signed with Decca Records. Her first charting single was 1971's "Hold to My Unchanging Love". This was followed by "Love Me", which became a top 40 hit and prompted the release of her debut studio album. In 1973, Pruett released the single "Satin Sheets", which became her biggest hit. The song spent several weeks at number one on the Billboard Hot Country Singles chart and crossed over to number 28 on the Hot 100. Its corresponding album of the same name also topped the Billboard Country Albums chart in July 1973.

Pruett followed the song's success with "I'm Your Woman", which also became a top ten hit on the country songs chart. Her self-titled third studio album was released in June 1974 and peaked at number 19 on the country albums chart. The album also included the single, "You Don't Need to Move a Mountain", a top 20 hit on the country chart in 1974. Pruett issued her fourth studio album, Honey on His Hands, in 1975, which reached the top 50 of the country albums survey. It spawned four singles, three of which became top 30 hits on the country chart. Its highest charting hit was "Welcome to the Sunshine (Sweet Baby Jane)" (1974). 

Pruett recorded a series of singles that became minor hits during the rest of the 1970s. In 1977, she briefly moved to Mercury Records, where she had one top forty hit with "I'm Living a Lie". Then, Pruett achieved success with the independent IBC label when three singles became top ten hits on the Billboard country chart: "Back to Back" (1979), "Temporarily Yours" (1980) and "It's Too Late" (1980). They were released on her 1979 studio album, Encore!, which reached number 18 on the country albums chart. Pruett continued recording sporadically throughout the 1980s. Her 1987 single "Rented Room" became her final to reach the Billboard country chart.

Albums

Studio albums

Live albums

Compilation albums

Singles

Other album appearances

References

External links 
 Jeanne Pruett complete discography at Discogs

Country music discographies
Discographies of American artists